Ergalatax dattilioi is a species of sea snail, a marine gastropod mollusk in the family Muricidae, the murex snails or rock snails.

Description
The length of the shell attains 16.2 mm.

Distribution
This marine species occurs off the Philippines.

References

External links
 MNHN, Paris: holotype

Ergalatax
Gastropods described in 1998